Urania Sternwarte is a public observatory in the Lindenhof quarter of Zürich, Switzerland. Its name Urania refers to the muse of astronomy in Greek mythology.

History 
Its origins base on a first observatory on the roof of the Zunfthaus zur Meisen. In 1759, so called «Astronomische Kommission» succeeded from this location for the first time, to define Culminatio solis and thus calculated the exact global location of the city of Zurich. In later years, astronomical observations were done from the Grossmünster's southern "Karl's tower", followed by scientific observations (not for public use by interested enthusiasts) from the Federal observatory, built 1861/64 for ETH Zürich by Gottfried Semper.

In 1899, the Zürich merchant Abraham Weill Einstein initiated the oldest observatory in Switzerland, situated near Werdmühleplatz (Uraniastrasse). On June 15, 1907, the observatory was given to operational use. Its  tower dominates the western end of Zurich's historic Altstadt.

Telescope 

Urania's refracting telescope is equipped with a Fraunhofer two-lens system of 30 cm aperture and focal length of 5.05 meters, allowing maximal 600-fold magnification (mostly used 150- to 205-fold magnification). The refractor in the dome area is the center of the imposing tower building: The telescope stands on a pillar, contact-free installed through the center of the building to the foundations of the business house Urania, fitted with anti-vibration installations.

Its optical telescope measures twelve tons and was designed by Carl Zeiss AG in Jena, Germany, considered as a technical masterpiece. Urania's refractor topped technological history as "Urania type". On its centenary anniversary, telescope and dome were fully renewed. On April 25, 2007, the telescope was hoisted into the observatory's 51 m high dome, on May 4, 2007, its second opening ceremony was celebrated.

Observations and limitations 
The observatory offers guided tours – Moon, Solar System objects, stars, star clusters, interstellar clouds, and galaxies – and special events for a wide audience, as well as individual tours for schools and groups. Paid public tours can be found on clear weather from Tuesday to Friday, starting at 20:00 (8 pm). The central location and the city of Zurich overriding observation tower also provide an unusual view of the city, Lake Zurich and Alps. The Urania house hosts a restaurant and an exclusive Bar, too. At the same time, its location in the middle of the city of Zurich is a serious problem: light pollution allows restricted observations of few galaxies and nebulae. Therefore, observations are limited practically to the moon and planets and bright celestial objects.

Cultural heritage of national importance 
The observatory is, as part of the building ensemble at that area, listed in the Swiss inventory of cultural property of national and regional significance as a Class A object of national importance.

See also
 List of astronomical observatories
 List of astronomical societies
 Lists of telescopes

References

External links 

Urania observatory 
Astronomische Gesellschaft Urania Zürich (Astronomical society Urania Zürich AGUZ) 

Urania
Public observatories
Buildings and structures in Zürich
Cultural property of national significance in the canton of Zürich
Tourist attractions in Zürich